Steven Hendambo (born June 14, 1986) is an Indonesian footballer.

Honours

Club honors
Persipura Jayapura
Indonesia Super League (1): 2010–11

External links
 profil in Liga Indonesia Official Website

1983 births
Living people
People from Jayapura
Indonesian footballers
Persidafon Dafonsoro players
Persitara Jakarta Utara players
Persiba Bantul players
Persipura Jayapura players
Persiram Raja Ampat players
Liga 1 (Indonesia) players
Liga 2 (Indonesia) players
Association football defenders
Sportspeople from Papua
21st-century Indonesian people